Victor Kede Manga (born 9 August 1952) is a Cameroonian wrestler. He competed at the 1980 Summer Olympics and the 1984 Summer Olympics.

References

External links
 

1952 births
Living people
Cameroonian male sport wrestlers
Olympic wrestlers of Cameroon
Wrestlers at the 1980 Summer Olympics
Wrestlers at the 1984 Summer Olympics
Place of birth missing (living people)